Totland is a village, civil parish and electoral ward on the Isle of Wight. Besides the village of Totland, the civil parish comprises the western tip of the Isle of Wight, and includes The Needles, Tennyson Down and the hamlet of Middleton.

The village of Totland lies on the Western peninsula where the Western Yar almost cuts through along with Alum Bay and Freshwater. It lies on the coast at Colwell Bay, which is the closest part of the island to the British mainland.

Today

It is linked to other parts of the island by Southern Vectis buses on route 7, and route 12 serving Freshwater, Yarmouth and Newport including intermediate villages. In the summer, open-top bus "The Needles Tour" also serves the village.

Christ Church, Totland is the Church of England parish.

Environmental concerns
During Christmas 2012, a large landslip overran a section of the sea wall between Totland Bay and adjacent Colwell Bay, also blocking the walkway which ran along the top of the wall. The local council sealed off the affected section from the public.  After a successful local campaign the council accepted a compromise solution and a new path over the landslip was opened to the public on 12th Sep 2015.

See also
 Christ Church, Totland 
 Totland Bay
 List of current places of worship on the Isle of Wight

References

Villages on the Isle of Wight
Civil parishes in the Isle of Wight